FC Krasnodar-2000 was a Russian association football club from Krasnodar, founded in 2000 and dissolved in 2011. It played in the Russian Second Division from 2001 to 2010. It was founded as FC Tsentr-R-Kavkaz Krasnodar and renamed to Krasnodar-2000 in their first season on the professional level in 2001. In 2011 the remains of the club were integrated in FC Kavkaztransgaz-2005 Ryzdvyany.

External links
Official Website

Association football clubs established in 2000
Association football clubs disestablished in 2011
Krasnodar-2000
2000 establishments in Russia
2011 disestablishments in Russia